Fumin station is a station of Line 4, Line 7 and Line 10 of the Shenzhen Metro. Line 4 platforms opened on 28 December 2004, Line 7 platforms opened on 28 October 2016 and Line 10 platforms opened on 18 August 2020. It is located under the junction of Jintian Lu and Fumin Lu in Futian District, Shenzhen, China. The station served as the southern terminus of Line 4 until 15 August 2007.

Station layout

Exits

References

Railway stations in Guangdong
Shenzhen Metro stations
Futian District
Railway stations in China opened in 2004